Olleya sediminilitoris is a Gram-negative bacterium from the genus of Olleya which has been isolated from tidal flat sediments from the Yellow Sea.

References

Flavobacteria
Bacteria described in 2021